Building at 217 West Main Street, also known as the Open Door Service Center Building, is a historic commercial building located at Sedalia, Pettis County, Missouri, US. It was built in 1874, and is a two-story, "L"-shaped, Italianate style brick building. A wing was added in 1906. It features a decorative metal cornice and three round arched windows. The building is known to have housed a brothel in the late-19th and early-20th centuries.

It was listed on the National Register of Historic Places in 1996.  It is located in the Sedalia Commercial Historic District.

References

Brothels in the United States
Individually listed contributing properties to historic districts on the National Register in Missouri
Commercial buildings on the National Register of Historic Places in Missouri
Italianate architecture in Missouri
Commercial buildings completed in 1874
Buildings and structures in Pettis County, Missouri
National Register of Historic Places in Pettis County, Missouri
1874 establishments in Missouri